Frank Joseph Urioste (born April 28, 1938) is an American film editor with about 30 film credits. He has been nominated three times for the Academy Award for Best Film Editing, for RoboCop (1987), Die Hard (1988), and Basic Instinct (1992).

Early life
Urioste was born to Frank T. Urioste and Angelina "Angie" Saracino (1909-2006).  He also has a sister, Carol.  His father worked as an airplane bomb sight manufacturer during World War II, and shortly afterwards started at MGM, where he was a music editor for over 30 years.

Career
Urioste began his career in 1957, when he worked with Henry Mancini at MGM as a music editor.

The first film that Urioste edited was What Ever Happened to Aunt Alice? (1969).  He continued to edit films during the 1970s, such as Midway (1976), Damnation Alley (1977) and The Boys in Company C (1978).  Urioste has also worked in television; in 1979, he edited the television film, I Know Why the Caged Bird Sings. In 1974, he edited the film The Spikes Gang.  In 1979, he edited Fast Break.

In 1983, he edited Amityville 3-D.  That same year, Urioste edited Trenchcoat, starring Margot Kidder and Robert Hays.  Other films that Urioste edited during the 1980s include Conan the Destroyer (1984), Die Hard (1988) and Road House (1989).  He also edited The Hitcher (1986), starring Rutger Hauer.  Urioste was nominated for an Academy Award for his editing in Die Hard.

Urioste has also collaborated with director Paul Verhoeven in such films as RoboCop (1987), Total Recall (1990) and Basic Instinct (1992).

In 1993, Urioste edited Cliffhanger.  That same year, he edited the film, Tombstone.  In 1995, he co-edited Cutthroat Island.  In 1996, he co-edited the film, Executive Decision, starring Kurt Russell.

Urioste used Avid Technology for the first time when he had less than four weeks to edit Lethal Weapon 4 (1998).

In addition to film editing, Urioste has been the senior vice president of feature development at Warner Bros. since 1998.  Urioste also served on the board of governors of the Academy of Motion Picture Arts & Sciences from 1994 to 1997 and is on the advisory board of the film editors branch of the Academy.

Urioste received the American Cinema Editors Career Achievement Award in 2007.

Personal life
He is married to Gemma Urioste.

Filmography

References

External links

American Cinema Editors
Living people
1938 births